The Billage of Perception: Chapter One is the debut extended play (EP) by South Korean girl group Billlie. It was released by Mystic Story on November 10, 2021, and distributed by Kakao Entertainment. The album consists of six tracks with "Ring X Ring" serving as its lead single and also the previously released song "Flowerld" but with modified version.

Background and composition 
On October 28, 2021, Mystic Story announced that Billlie, previously known as "Mystic Rookies", would be debuting with their first EP in early November. The same day, a B-side of the EP, "Flowerld", was pre-released alongside a lyric video as a gift for fans. The Billage of Perception: Chapter One and the music video for its lead single, "Ring X Ring" were released simultaneously on November 10. The title track was composed and arranged by Lee Min-soo with lyrics by Kim Eana and its music video was directed by Hwang Su-ah: they are collectively known as "Team IU", as they have worked on many tracks for the South Korean singer and actress IU. The members Siyoon and Moon Sua also contributed to make rap parts. The choreography was handled by Lia Kim, who leads 1Million Dance Studio. "Ring x Ring" contains a mysterious story surrounding what happened in a village, a story which marks the start to an upcoming story universe.

Commercial performance 
The Billage of Perception: Chapter One sold 24,698 copies in South Korea and it peaked at number 12 on the Gaon Album Chart in the issue dated November 7–13. Its lead single "Ring X Ring" did not enter the Gaon Digital Chart, but appeared at number 167 on the component Download Chart.

Promotion 
A few hours ahead of the release of The Billage of Perception: Chapter One, a showcase was held in live-streaming. The group promoted the lead single on leading music programs and the B-side "Flipping a Coin" on 3 South Korean music programs, as M Countdown, Show Champion and The Show. Their last performance was on Arirang TV's Fly High K-pop Concert.

Track listing 

Notes
 "Ring X Ring", and "Flowerld" are stylized in all caps.
 "The Eleventh Day", and "The Rumor" are stylized in all lowercase.
 "Flipping a Coin" is stylized as "flipp!ng a coin".
 "Everybody's Got a Secret" is stylized as "everybody's got a $ECRET".

Charts

Weekly chart

Monthly chart

Sales

Release history

References 

Billlie albums
2021 debut EPs
Korean-language EPs